Dundrum Cricket Club is a cricket club in Dundrum, County Down, Northern Ireland, playing in League 1 of the NCU Senior League.

Dundrum Cricket Club (DCC) was founded in 1903.  The first clubhouse was a gift from Lord Downshire and was previously the late Lady Downshire’s studio. The current clubhouse was opened in 1995 with the store being built in 2013. The club originally played in the East Down League until this folded in the early sixties. In 1964 the club joined the Northern Cricket Union (NCU). The First XI currently sits in the Ulster Bank Section 2 League of the NCU. There are over 50 junior members.

External links

1903 establishments in the United Kingdom
Cricket clubs in County Down
NCU Senior League members
Cricket clubs in Northern Ireland
Cricket clubs established in 1903